Omladinski fudbalski klub Mladost DG is a football club from the southwestern part of Podgorica, Montenegro. It was founded in 2019, they currently compete in Montenegrin Second League.

History 
OFK Mladost DG is founded in 2019, as a team from Donja Gorica neighbourhood. From the beginning, the club is operating under an affiliate partnership with FK Podgorica, whose young players are members of OFK Mladost DG.
The club made significant results during their first performance in official competitions. In the summer of 2019, OFK Mladost DG won the Central Region Cup and played in the first leg of Montenegrin Cup 2019-20, but they were defeated by FK Drezga (2-4). At the same time, the team started to play in Montenegrin Third League. In their very first season, OFK Mladost DG won the trophy of Third League - Center champion, but failed to get promotion to second-tier, after the playoffs against FK Igalo and FK Berane.
Next season, OFK Mladost DG won the Central Region champions' title again and this time succeeded to gain promotion via playoffs, with two victories against FK Petnjica (2-0) and FK Cetinje (6-0). With that success, in the summer of 2021, the team from Donja Gorica became a member of the Montenegrin Second League.

Honours
Montenegrin Third League - Center – 1
winners (2): 2019–20, 2020–21
Central Region Cup – 1
winners (1): 2019–20

Current squad

Stadium 

OFK Mladost DG is playing their home games on DG Arena, whose capacity is 4,000 seats. With modern facilities as additional grounds and other, it meets the criteria for First League and UEFA matches.

See also 
 DG Arena
 FK Podgorica
 Montenegrin Second League
 Football in Montenegro

References

Association football clubs established in 2019
Football clubs in Podgorica